In enzymology, a 2-aminoethylphosphonate—pyruvate transaminase is an enzyme that catalyzes the chemical reaction

(2-aminoethyl)phosphonate + pyruvate  2-phosphonoacetaldehyde + L-alanine

Thus, the two substrates of this enzyme are (2-aminoethyl)phosphonate and pyruvate, whereas its two products are 2-phosphonoacetaldehyde and L-alanine.

This enzyme belongs to the family of transferases, specifically the transaminases, which transfer nitrogenous groups.  The systematic name of this enzyme class is (2-aminoethyl)phosphonate:pyruvate aminotransferase. Other names in common use include (2-aminoethyl)phosphonate transaminase, (2-aminoethyl)phosphonate aminotransferase, (2-aminoethyl)phosphonic acid aminotransferase, 2-aminoethylphosphonate-pyruvate aminotransferase, 2-aminoethylphosphonate aminotransferase, 2-aminoethylphosphonate transaminase, AEP transaminase, and AEPT.  This enzyme participates in aminophosphonate metabolism.  It employs one cofactor, pyridoxal phosphate.

Structural studies

As of late 2007, only one structure has been solved for this class of enzymes, with the PDB accession code .

References

 
 
 
 

EC 2.6.1
Pyridoxal phosphate enzymes
Enzymes of known structure